The Rishengchang Piaohao, was the first draft bank in China. It is located in Pingyao, Shanxi province, China.  literally translates to 'Sunrise Prosperity', and  means 'draft banks', the predecessors of modern banks in China. It was estimated to be founded during the Qing Dynasty in 1823. In the nineteenth century, at its peak, it controlled almost half of the Chinese economy and its branches were widespread throughout major cities in China, and also in some foreign countries, including Russia, Mongolia, and Japan.

The draft bank is now a museum and in 2006 was included on the List of Major National Historical and Cultural Sites (6-484).

Rishengchang and Piaohao 

Rishengchang, the first draft bank or piaohao, originated from Xiyuecheng Dye Company Pingyao in central Shanxi. Rishengchang was estimated to be founded during the Qing Dynasty in 1823. However, the exact founding year remains controversial. Some scholars argue it was founded in 1797 or 1824. To deal with the transfer of large amounts of cash from one branch to another, the company introduced drafts, cashable in the company's many branches around China. Although this new method was originally designed for business transactions within the Xiyuecheng Company, it became so popular that in 1823 the owner gave up the dye business altogether and reorganized the company as a special remittance firm, Rishengchang Piaohao.

In the next thirty years, eleven  were established in Shanxi province, including Pingyao and the neighboring counties of Qi County, Taigu, and Yuci. By the end of the nineteenth century, thirty-two  with 475 branches were in business covering most of China, and the central Shanxi region became the de facto financial centre of Qing China.

All  were organised as single proprietaries or partnerships, where the owners carried unlimited liability. They concentrated on interprovincial remittances and later on, conducting government services. From the time of the Taiping Rebellion, when transportation routes between the capital and the provinces were cut off,  began involvement with the delivery of government tax revenue.  grew by taking on a role in advancing funds and arranging foreign loans for provincial governments, issuing notes, and running regional treasuries.

Lei Lutai, the first general manager of the Rishengchang, died at his desk in 1849. Though his son was an employee at the bank, Lei had named another employee, Cheng Qingpan, to be his successor.

Cheng Qingpan and two subsequent general managers loaned prudently, and the Rishengchang prospered greatly under their management. In 1880, the capital shareholders of the bank, at the request of Li, had created a wholly new class of non‐voting capital shares, which were named  ('attached shares'), for managers. These shares would let the managers of the bank reinvest their dividends back into the Rishengchang without gaining votes in the decision-making process.

Following the death of Li Zhenshi in 1891, his nephew and adopted son, Li Wudian, interested all of Zhenshi's capital shares. Under the ownership of Li Wudian, the Rishengchang would continue to be led by very competent general managers. Unlike Li Zhenshi, Li Wudian hoped to influence the lending policies of the Rishengchang.

The new konggu had full voting rights during grand assessment days and unlike the capital shares, did not require any investments in silver. By creating these new voting shares, Li Wudian had made himself the absolute leader of the Rishengchang and could outvote all the other shareholders.

Using his newly created , Li Wudian was able to vote himself into the position of vice-president of the Rishengchang and gave himself one expertise share; this move gave him a position equal to that of general manager and during the expertise shareholder meetings he had equal voting rights. Li Wudian was both the top insider as well as the controlling shareholder of the Rishengchang. None of the other managers of the Rishengchang had the courage to go against and criticise Li Wudian's lending-related decisions, as he could fire anyone. Furthermore, he controlled their expertise share allotment as well as the retirement benefits that they would receive. When the general manager of the Rishengchang dared oppose the decisions that Li had made, contradictory orders would only add to the general confusion that plagued the bank under his reign.

In 1911 and 1912, the performance of the Rishengchang would greatly deteriorate, causing the bank to operate at a net loss. The diminishing returns caused the brothers of Li Wudian to exchange their capital shares in silver. This made the management desperate and Li Wudian had to find new sources to borrow capital from.

In 1914, the branch manager of the Beijing branch office of the Rishengchang was unable to make good on his guarantee of a debt of the failed Heshengyuan Bank. In response he fled back to the province of Shanxi. Later, a warrant was issued for the arrest of the capital shareholders of the Rishengchang as they were held responsible for the act, as the capital shareholders still carried unlimited liability for the actions of the bank. In 1915, under the new Chinese Republican civil code, the creditors that were owed the money would become the new common shareholders of the Rishengchang and they subsequently withdrew the charges that were held against the Li brothers. The new owners of the bank granted the Li brothers an annual salary of 1000 silver dollars.

The reorganised Rishengchang, which only had a single equity class, would continue to operate until 1932, when the bank was forced to permanently close its doors at the height of the global economic Great Depression.

Rishengchang Code Rule  

In 1824, Rishengchang set up a branch in Taiyuan. The main business was cheques or drafts, which were called tickets in Chinese. At that time, Taiyuan was the base camp of Shanxi businessmen's distribution and maintenance of goods. In order to work efficiently, Rishengchang introduced the world's most advanced printing technology at that time—the watermark method. Rishengchang used this method to produce and print the tickets. Additionally, each ticket was stamped with a seal in the key parts. Of course, the amounts and recipients of the tickets were strictly controlled.

When the Shanxi traders went to other provinces and the frontier border transaction station, they always brought the drafts written by the professional official in Taiyuan Rishengchang using an ink brush. The handwriting had to be simultaneously bulletined and sent to the other 51 branches of Rishengchang. Specifically, the drafts were executed with codes, using Chinese writing to replace numbers and regularly changing the password method to prevent disclosure of confidential information.

References

External links 
 Travel China Guide profile
 China Today profile of Pingyao

Defunct banks of China
Banks established in 1823
Jinzhong
Major National Historical and Cultural Sites in Shanxi